Saint-Marcellin is a commune in the Isère department, in southeastern France, 51 km from Grenoble.

The town is served by a railway station, on the line from Valence to Grenoble.

Population

Twin towns
Saint-Marcellin is twinned with:

  Grafing, Germany, since 1994
  Fiesso d'Artico, Italy, since 2007

See also
Communes of the Isère department
Parc naturel régional du Vercors

References

Communes of Isère
Isère communes articles needing translation from French Wikipedia